Kate Witek is a former Nebraska Auditor of Public Accounts, member of the Nebraska Legislature, and candidate for Lieutenant Governor of Nebraska. She was first elected Nebraska State Auditor in November 1998 as a Republican. She was reelected in 2002 as a Republican but was defeated in her attempt for a third term in 2006 after switching to the Democratic Party.

Political career and party switch
Witek began her career as a Republican, winning election to the nonpartisan unicameral Nebraska Legislature in November 1992 from District 31 in southwestern Omaha. She was the elected Republican nominee for Lieutenant Governor in 1994 and ran as a team with Gene Spence, the unsuccessful Republican candidate for Governor. After the 1994 election the legislature changed the Nebraska Constitution so that the position of Lieutenant Governor became an appointed position instead of an elected position. Witek was reelected to the Legislature in 1996 but resigned from her District 31 seat upon her swearing-in as the first woman Nebraska Auditor of Public Accounts in January 1999. She was reelected State Auditor in 2002.

After running as the Lieutenant Governor candidate with unsuccessful Governor candidate Tom Osborne, Republican Witek decided to switch parties in August 2006, citing concerns about a Republican Party that, in her own words, "...was only looking at controlling all the offices instead of looking at resolving the problems challenging this state."

Witek had initially decided to forgo reelection in 2006, but after she switched parties, the Nebraska Democratic Party nominated her as their candidate for Auditor at their State Convention in Grand Island, Nebraska.

Personal life
Kate Witek is married to Charles Witek.

See also
 List of American politicians who switched parties in office

References

Living people
Nebraska Auditors of Public Accounts
Nebraska Democrats
Nebraska Republicans
Nebraska state senators
Women state legislators in Nebraska
Place of birth missing (living people)
Year of birth missing (living people)
21st-century American women